The sixth season of Weeds premiered on August 16, 2010, on the television cable network Showtime, and consisted of 13 episodes.

Plot 
After Shane kills Pilar, the Botwin family flees north. Andy joins them after Audra breaks off their relationship. Unable to enter Canada without the baby's birth certificate, Nancy, Andy, Silas, Shane, and Stevie assume new identities as "The Newmans" (as Nathalie, Randy, Mike, Shawn, and Avi, respectively) and settle in Seattle, Washington.

Nancy, Andy, and Silas take menial jobs as scab labor at a local hotel, where Nancy discovers the resident drug dealer is also on strike. Sensing an opportunity, Nancy seeks out a local distributor and, lacking money to buy marijuana, instead buys the seller's trimmings and produces hashish using the hotel's laundry equipment. Back in southern California, Esteban tasks Cesar and Ignacio with finding Nancy and bringing back Stevie. While looking for clues at the Ren Mar house, they encounter Doug and coerce him into helping find the Botwins.

Nancy and Andy are questioned by police officers about unpaid parking tickets linked to the stolen license plates on Andy's minivan. Nancy convinces Silas to steal his girlfriend's car, and the family flees again. Cesar and Ignacio receive a phone call from Doug about the location of Andy's van; they travel to Seattle and search for clues in the van. At their motel, Nancy spots Doug tied up in the back of Cesar's car. Panicked, Nancy attempts to gather the family: a series of events transpires, culminating with Shane calling his mother to tell her he has been kidnapped by Cesar and Ignacio.

Cesar negotiates a trade with Nancy: Shane for Stevie. Despite agreeing, Nancy meets Cesar with a crossbow, and shoots Cesar in the leg. She receives a phone call from Ignacio, who unintentionally tells her about his run-in with the rest of her family at a local diner. When Nancy arrives at the diner, she attempts to negotiate with Ignacio by holding a gun under the table. Ignacio calls her bluff – Shane then takes the gun, and Ignacio reluctantly folds to Shane. The Botwin family (and Doug) continue to flee; they purchase a used RV and travel to an out-of-the-way trailer park. Nancy goes to a local bar and has sex with the married bartender. When it is revealed that the bartender's wife is a neighbor, the Botwins are subsequently chased out of town.

In Colorado, the family continues to bargain for the trimmings of other dealers' weed. When Stevie's feces are an abnormal color, Nancy visits a pediatrician. The doctor says Stevie is fine, but suggests the baby may not be bonding with Nancy, and that the baby's lifestyle could be a factor, making Nancy rethink their way of life.

The group travels to Nancy's hometown, Dearborn, Michigan, where they stay with Nancy's former high school teacher, Mr. Schiff (Richard Dreyfuss), with whom she had a sexual relationship from the age of 14. Silas discovers that Judah is not his biological father, but that his father is Nancy's former boyfriend, Lars. The Botwins are found by an investigative journalist named Vaughn, who is writing an article about Nancy. She gives him the information he needs to write the story, in exchange for cash to buy passports. Doug returns to Agrestic, retitled Regrestic after the fire, where he tries to win back his wife. Mr. Schiff steals money from a post office for plane tickets to Copenhagen for the family, himself included. Nancy goes to meet Vaughn a final time before leaving, only to find his room has been ransacked; Esteban and Guillermo are waiting for her.

Esteban and Guillermo take Nancy to the airport to find Stevie. Nancy manages to contact Andy, telling him to use "Plan C". Esteban threatens Silas and takes Stevie; Nancy agrees to leave the airport with them, and they tell her they are going to kill her. Andy, Silas, Shane and Mr. Schiff board the plane to Copenhagen, but Mr. Schiff is arrested for the post office robbery. As Nancy leaves the airport, they are confronted by the FBI. As part of "Plan C", Nancy confesses to the murder of Pilar, simultaneously saving her own life, ensuring the safety of her family, and covering for Shane.

Cast

Main cast 
Mary-Louise Parker as Nancy Botwin (13 episodes)
Hunter Parrish as Silas Botwin (13 episodes)
Alexander Gould as Shane Botwin (13 episodes)
Justin Kirk as Andy Botwin (13 episodes)
Kevin Nealon as Doug Wilson (10 episodes)

Special guest stars 
Jennifer Jason Leigh as Jill Price-Grey
Demián Bichir as Esteban Reyes
Guillermo Díaz as Guillermo García Gómez
Alanis Morissette as Dr. Audra Kitson
Linda Hamilton as Linda
Mark-Paul Gosselaar as Jack

Recurring cast 

Richard Dreyfuss as Warren Schiff
Andy Milder as Dean Hodes
Renée Victor as Lupita
Enrique Castillo as Cesar de la Cruz
Hemky Madera as Ignacio Morero, Jr.
John Fleck as Agent Lipschitz
Eric Lange as Vaughn Coleman
Rick Ravanello as Lars Guinard
Assaf Cohen as Hooman Jaka
Matt Peters as Gayle
Aisha Hinds as Latrice
Jessica St. Clair as Rebekkah
Jama Williamson as Allison
Jamie Renée Smith as Kimmi
Sugar Lyn Beard as Fiona
David Diaan as Daoud Mahmud
Ayelet Ben-Shahar as Adara
Marian Filali as Rida
Ed Corbin as Police Officer
Monette McGrath as Cheryl
Chris Marquette as Trip
Adam Rose as Joe Knock
Fred Cross as Translator
Paul Hayes as Sheriff
Peter Stormare as Chef

Episodes

References

External links 
 
 

 
2010 American television seasons